The following units of the Russian army, air force, and Russian navy participated in the invasion of Georgia in 2008.

Order of battle

58th Army
19th Motorized Rifle Division
 249th Motorized Rifle Regiment
 503rd Motorized Rifle Regiment
 693rd Motorized Rifle Regiment
 292nd Self-propelled Artillery Regiment
 481st Air defense missile Regiment
 141st Armor Battalion
 Armored engineer Battalion
 Military intelligence battalion
 Signal battalion
 Chemical battalion
 Supply battalion
 Mechanical battalion
 Medical battalion
 136th Guards Motorized Infantry Brigade
 205th Motorized Infantry Brigade

Supporting units
 135th Motorized Infantry Regiment
 291st Self-propelled Artillery Regiment
 67th Air Defense Regiment
 1,128th Antitank Regiment
 943rd Rocket Launcher Regiment
 487th Helicopter Regiment
 11th Engineer Regiment
 234th Signal Regiment
 22nd Electronic Warfare Regiment
 Elements of 76th and 98th Guards Airborne Divisions
 two companies from 42nd Motorized Rifle Division

Operations in Abkhazia
 131st Moor Rifle Brigade
 Elements of 76th and 98th Guards Airborne Divisions

4th Air Army
1st Composite Air Division
 368th Assault Aviation Regiment
 461st Assault Aviation Regiment
 960th Assault Air Regiment
 5559th Bomber Aviation Regiment
 959th Bomber Aviation Regiment

51st Air Defense Corps
 3rd Fighter Aviation Regiment
 19th Fighter Aviation Regiment
 31st Fighter Aviation Regiment
 Two SAM regiments  Unattached units
 11th Reconnaissance Air Regiment
 535th Composite Air Regiment
 55th Helicopter Regiment
 487th Helicopter Regiment
 325th Transport Helicopter Regiment

Naval forces
 Slava class cruiser
 Kashin class destroyer
 Alligator class and Topucha class landing ships
 smaller craft

Sources

 Costello, Bruce "The Russo-Georgian War of 2008." in Strategy & Tactics, No. 264 (September/October 2010).

Orders of battle